The Champion Beer of Britain (also known as CBOB) is an award presented by the Campaign for Real Ale (CAMRA), at its annual Great British Beer Festival in early August.

Qualification and judging

Beers can qualify for the Champion Beer of Britain in three ways:

 CAMRA tasting panels judge the beers in their geographic area of the UK.  The recommendations of these panels are put forward to 6 regional panels, with the winners of these qualifying for the finals in August.
 Votes from CAMRA members via a form in What's Brewing, the CAMRA newsletter.
 Winning one of the 150 Beer Of The Festival awards from CAMRA beer festivals held throughout the year

Nominated beers are then grouped into categories and go through several rounds of blind tasting at the Great British Beer Festival (GBBF). Category winners are then re-judged to determine the supreme champion — the Supreme Champion Beer Of Britain.

Up until 2015, the Supreme Champion was to be announced at the GBBF.  In 2016, however, the announcement was made at a special Champion Beer of Britain Awards Dinner held in the evening of 9 August (the first day of that year's festival) at the Kensington Olympia Hilton Hotel on the first day of the festival.  The change was made to raise the profile of the competition. After an outcry from members the process of announcing the winning beers during the trade day afternoon at GBBF was quickly reinstated. 

The judges of the competition usually include professional brewers, beer writers, and respected beer enthusiasts.  The focus of the judging is whether the judges actually enjoy the beer, as opposed to the American approach of judging a beer's technical merits.

While the award is prestigious, winning has sometimes caused problems for smaller breweries who have been unable to meet the demand for their champion beers caused by the newfound fame and publicity.

Categories

Beers are split into categories depending on their style or strength

 Mild
 Bitter
 Best Bitter
 Special Bitter
 Strong Ale (until 1990)
 Strong Bitter (from 1991)
 Golden Ales

 New Brewery (until 1990)
 Old Ales (see note below)
 Barley Wines (see note below)
 Porters & Stouts
 Speciality Bitters
 Bottle-Conditioned Beers

Name changes

The Old Ales & Barley Wines category has been renamed over the years. The award was first presented in 1991. In 1992 the category was split into two - Old Ales and Barley Wines. The new Old Ales category was renamed in 1993 to Old Ales & Strong Milds, changed again to Old Ales & Strong Ales in 1994, finally reverting to Old Ales & Strong Milds in 1996.

The Strong Ale category was changed in 1991 to Strong Bitter, with the Strong Milds joining the Old Ales category.

Winter ales

Since 1996 the Old Ales & Strong Milds, Barley Wines and Porters & Stouts have been judged as part of the Champion Winter Beer Of Britain awards at the National Winter Ales Festival.

Results

Key
 Blue background indicates beers that were named Supreme Champion after winning in their category.

Supreme Champion category
From 1990 onwards Gold, Silver and Bronze awards were made instead of just having an overall winner.

Mild category

Bitter category

Best Bitter category

Golden Ale category

Strong Ale category

Strong Bitter category
Successor to the Strong Ale category.  Strong Milds were transferred to the Old Ales category.

Speciality Beer category

New Brewery category

Premium Bitter category

Special Bitter category

Bottle-conditioned Beers category

References

 
 
 

Beer awards
British awards
Beer in the United Kingdom